Nasoona chrysanthusi is a species of dwarf spider. It is named after Father Chrysanthus.

References

Linyphiidae